Rhyssoplax aerea huttoni is a subspecies of chiton in the family Chitonidae, endemic to New Zealand.

References
 Powell A W B, New Zealand Mollusca, William Collins Publishers Ltd, Auckland, New Zealand 1979 

Chitonidae
Chitons of New Zealand